is a male Japanese voice actor from Tokyo affiliated with 81 Produce.

Roles

Television animation
Agatha Christie's Great Detectives Poirot and Marple (Inspector Mirā)
Ai Yori Aoshi (Yōda)
Azuki-chan (Tako-sensei, Sendai's uncle)
Bobobo-bo Bo-bobo (Jelly Jiggler)
Buso Renkin (Shishaku Chōno)
Detective Conan (Masao Horī, Medical examiner, judge)
Detective School Q (Criminal)
Digimon Adventure (Kokatorimon)
Digimon Frontier (Eldest Kokuwamon, Gōtomon)
Dragon Ball Super (Lord Zuno)
Fullmetal Alchemist (Mason)
Geisters (Nikiasu Sarakia)
Gin Tama (Mysterious Thief Fundoshi Mask)
Hakugei: Legend of the Moby Dick (Doc)
Higurashi When They Cry (Motodai)
Kamiwaza Wanda (Ichiban-Hoshi Teru, device computer voice)
Kiddy Grade (Criminal)
Kindaichi Case Files (Detective, Tamasaburō Ichikawa, Ryō Yagisawa, Detective Takada)
Le Chevalier D'Eon (Vorontsov)
Macross 7 (Doctor Chiba)
MÄR (Maira)
MegaMan NT Warrior series (Mahajarama Yahoot)
Mirmo! (Rarumu)
Mobile Suit Victory Gundam (Oliver Inoe)
Monkey Typhoon (Briggins)
Monster (Shōne)
One Piece (Thalassa Lucas, Igaram, Terracotta, Rapa Nui, Bushon, Gorosei, McKinley, Mekao, Princess (Center Baskerville), Spoil, Silvers Rayleigh)
Pokémon Advanced Generation (Team Aqua member A)
Renkin 3-kyū Magical ? Pokān (Regurā)
Sgt. Frog (Robobo)
Tonde Burin (Kondo Masayoshi, clerk)
Toriko (Koppowo)
Konjiki no Gash Bell!! (Sebastian, Bago)
Zoids: Chaotic Century (Doctor D)
Zoids: Genesis (Para)

Theatrical animation
Episode of Alabasta: The Desert Princess and the Pirates (Terracotta)

Video games
Daraku Tenshi - The Fallen Angels (Tarō)
Final Fantasy Crystal Chronicles: Ring of Fates (Alhanalem)
Super Robot Wars series (Oliver Inoe)
Jumping Flash! 2 (Baron Aloha)

Drama CDs
Tsumi Series (Ken'ichi Osame)

Dubbing roles

Live-action
24 (fourth season) (Marwan's subordinate)

Animation
Batman: The Brave and the Bold (Captain Cold, Kobra)
The Cramp Twins (Mr. Cramp)
Donkey Kong Country (General Klump)
Insektors (Protokol, palace guard)
Kipper the Dog (Tiger)
Waking Life (Steven Soderbergh)

Tokusatsu roles
 Denji Sentai Megaranger (Boss Kunekune/King Kunekune (ep. 14))
 Mirai Sentai Timeranger (Mad Scientist Genbu (ep. 25 - 26))
 Hyakujuu Sentai GaoRanger (Tombstone Org (ep. 29))
 Ninpuu Sentai Hurricaneger ("Back To" Ninja Octonyuudou (ep. 14))
 Bakuryuu Sentai Abaranger (Trinoid #7: Jishakunagengorou (ep. 7, 13))
 Tokusou Sentai Dekaranger (Gimonlian Angorl (ep. 49))
 GoGo Sentai Boukenger (Tsukumogami Nendogami (ep. 14))
 Kamen Rider Den-O (Ivy Imagin (ep. 11 - 12))
 Samurai Sentai Shinkenger (Ayakashi Tsubotoguro (ep. 42))
 Kaizoku Sentai Gokaiger (Zaggai (ep. 13 - 14))
 Shuriken Sentai Ninninger (Yokai Fudagaeshi (ep. 43))

References

External links
 
81 Produce

1960 births
Japanese male voice actors
Living people
Male voice actors from Tokyo
81 Produce voice actors